Donald H. Baucom, (born 22 July 1949) is a clinical psychology faculty member at the University of North Carolina-Chapel Hill. He is recognized for founding the field of Cognitive-Behavioral Couples Therapy. Baucom is also recognized as one of the top marital therapists and most prolific researchers in this field. Currently, Baucom's National Cancer Institute funded study, CanThrive, has the largest observationally coded sample of any couples study to date.

Biography 
Baucom lives in Chapel Hill, North Carolina where he is the Richard Lee Simpson Distinguished Professor of Psychology at UNC. He is a familiar face on campus, having received both his bachelor's degree and his Ph.D. from UNC. Baucom's son Brian is also a Clinical Psychologist. Brian worked in southern California where he received his Ph.D. from the University of California, Los Angeles. He currently works at the University of Utah.

Research description 

For over thirty years, Donald H. Baucom has focused his research on the dynamics of intimate relationships and how various factors contribute to distress, as well as joy, in couples. As a strong proponent of the scientist-practitioner model he is committed to the development of empirically based effective interventions for partners in intimate relationships. In doing so, he has been a leader in the development of the theoretical, empirical, and clinical foundation of cognitive-behavioral therapy that is used for helping couples in distress. Baucom has spent his career observing the ways in which couples interact, and how these individual interaction styles can cause both distress and joy in relationships based on factors such as social support, health, and infidelity.

Social Support: Baucom has been interested in the ways by which social support styles contribute to both positive and negative functioning during the course of a relationship.

Health: Baucom has studied the ways in which physiological/psychological health can become stressors in a dyad that can contribute to distress. For example, he has developed intervention studies based on the effects of anorexia, cancer, smoking, and arthritis with regards to couples functioning.

Infidelity: This area is of particular interest to Baucom due to the severity of the direct distress it causes to the relationship. He has collaborated with his colleagues to develop a self-help book for partners experiencing infidelity, and is in the process of creating a training manual to guide practitioners in the aid of couples dealing with infidelity.

Obsessive-compulsive disorder: Baucom has collaborated with experts on obsessive-compulsive disorder (OCD) to develop a couple-based cognitive-behavioral treatment approach for couples in which one partner has this anxiety-related disorder. The treatment involves primarily bringing the non-OCD partner into therapy and training him or her to be a coach to help with exposure and response prevention for the partner with OCD. The couple also learns effective communication strategies and techniques for reducing accommodation and avoidance behaviors together.

CanThrive
Currently, Baucom is working on a large-scale treatment study funded by the National Cancer Institute called CanThrive. This is a couple-based intervention focused on partnerships in which the female has breast cancer. This study observes and measures various aspects of communicated social support between both partners, and is interested in finding possible relationships between differences in social support and treatment outcomes for breast cancer. This study has the largest observationally coded sample of any couples study to date, and is based at both the University of North Carolina at Chapel Hill and Duke University. Additionally, he is collaborating with colleagues conducting a similar study in Germany.

Selected works and publications 
Books

Academic Journals

References

External links
 UNC Faculty Research Page for Donald Baucom
 CanThrive Home Page

21st-century American psychologists
University of North Carolina at Chapel Hill faculty
Living people
1949 births
20th-century American psychologists